Stéphane Yvon Quintal (born October 22, 1968) is a Canadian former professional ice hockey player who played in the National Hockey League (NHL) for 16 seasons. He served as senior vice president of player safety for the NHL from 2014 to 2016.

Playing career
Quintal played 16 NHL seasons before retiring as a player in August 2005. He had been the last Montreal Canadiens player to wear number 5 before the Canadiens retired it in honour of Bernie "Boom-Boom" Geoffrion.

Quintal joined the Department of Player Safety, one of the NHL's disciplinary arms, at its creation at the opening of the 2011–12 season. The head of the department was initially Brendan Shanahan, who left his position after the completion of the 2013–14 regular season to become president of the Toronto Maple Leafs. At the time, Quintal became the head of the department on an interim basis. On September 8, 2014, the NHL named Quintal the permanent head of the department with the title of senior vice president of player safety. Quintal continued Shanahan's practice of releasing videos explaining his rulings on plays that were sent to the league office for review. However, he only narrated French-language videos for incidents involving the Canadiens or Ottawa Senators, a practice dating to when Shanahan ran the department. All other videos are narrated by a deputy, Patrick Burke. He held the post until 2016, when he was succeeded by George Parros.

Career statistics

Regular season and playoffs

International

Director of Player Safety
After taking over the job from Brendan Shanahan on April 11, 2014, Quintal was quickly faced with a repeat offender in the form of Minnesota Wild forward Matt Cooke.  Cooke had kneed Colorado Avalanche defenseman Tyson Barrie during round one of the 2014 playoffs, ending his season. Cooke received a 7-game suspension and returned for round two of the playoffs.

Transactions
February 7, 1992: Traded by the Boston Bruins, along with Craig Janney, to the St. Louis Blues in exchange for Adam Oates.
September 24, 1993: Traded by the St. Louis Blues, along with Nelson Emerson, to the Winnipeg Jets in exchange for Phil Housley.
July 8, 1995: Traded by the Winnipeg Jets to the Montreal Canadiens in exchange for Montreal's 1995 2nd round draft choice.
July 13, 1999: Signed as a free agent with the New York Rangers.
October 5, 2000: Claimed on waivers by the Chicago Blackhawks from the New York Rangers.
June 23, 2001: Traded by the Chicago Blackhawks to the Montreal Canadiens in exchange for Montreal's 2001 4th round draft choice.
June 27, 2004: Traded by the Montreal Canadiens to the Los Angeles Kings in exchange for future considerations.

Awards and achievements
QMJHL First All-Star Team (1987)

See also
List of NHL players with 1000 games played

References

External links

1968 births
Boston Bruins draft picks
Boston Bruins players
Canadian ice hockey defencemen
Chicago Blackhawks players
French Quebecers
Granby Bisons players
Hull Olympiques players
Ice hockey people from Quebec
Living people
Montreal Canadiens players
National Hockey League first-round draft picks
New York Rangers players
People from Boucherville
St. Louis Blues players
Winnipeg Jets (1979–1996) players